Lambom is a village on the south-west coast of New Ireland, Papua New Guinea, south of Lamassa. Lambom Island lies off the coast. It is located in Konoagil Rural LLG.

References

Populated places in New Ireland Province